Hato is a town and municipality in the Santander Department in northeastern Colombia.

External links
 Hato official website

Municipalities of Santander Department